In probability theory, Le Cam's theorem, named after Lucien Le Cam (1924 – 2000), states the following.

Suppose:

  are independent random variables, each with a Bernoulli distribution (i.e., equal to either 0 or 1), not necessarily identically distributed.
 
 
   (i.e.  follows a Poisson binomial distribution)

Then

In other words, the sum has approximately a Poisson distribution and the above inequality bounds the approximation error in terms of the total variation distance.

By setting pi = λn/n, we see that this generalizes the usual Poisson limit theorem.

When  is large a better bound is possible: , where  represents the  operator. 

It is also possible to weaken the independence requirement.

References

External links
 

Probability theorems
Probabilistic inequalities
Statistical inequalities
Theorems in statistics